Anders Ågnes Konradsen (born 18 July 1990) is a Norwegian former professional footballer. He has previously played for the Norwegian clubs Bodø/Glimt, Strømsgodset and Rosenborg, and the French club Rennes. He was a part of the Norwegian team that played in the 2013 UEFA European Under-21 Football Championship, and has also been capped for Norway at senior level.

Early years
Konradsen was born in Bodø, where he also grew up. He is an older brother of fellow footballer Morten Konradsen.

He was promoted to Bodø/Glimt's first-team squad along with Stefan Johansen ahead of the 2007 season, and Konradsen made his first-team debut against Lofoten in the second round of the 2007 Norwegian Football Cup. He first represented Norway at under-16 level, and after his performances for the under-18 team he was wanted by the Italian side Sampdoria.

Club career
Konradsen made his break-through in Bodø/Glimt's first team in the 2009 season, and played 26 matches as a winger for the team that was relegated from Tippeligaen. In the following season, he was Bodø/Glimt's top goalscorer in the First Division with nine goals.

After the 2010 season, Konradsen was wanted by Tromsø and Aalesund in addition to Ole Gunnar Solskjær's Molde, but joined Strømsgodset ahead of the 2011 season in a deal where Jim Johansen transferred the other way.

Konradsen was sold to the French club Rennes for 15 million NOK in January 2013, and became the most expensive player Strømsgodset had ever sold. He made his debut for Rennes in the Ligue 1 in the 2–0 victory against Toulouse on 10 February 2013.

On 16 August 2015 Rosenborg signed Konradsen on a three and a half-year contract for an undisclosed sum.

International career
Konradsen has represented Norway from under-16 to under-23 level, and was included in the Norwegian under-21 squad for the 2013 UEFA European Under-21 Football Championship. Konradsen started the opening match against Israel U-21, and had one shot in the crossbar and another in the post when Norway drew 2–2. In the second match of the tournament against England U21, Harmeet Singh was chosen ahead of Konradsen in the starting line-up.

Konradsen made his debut for the senior team in the friendly match against Hungary in November 2012, and was also called up for the friendly matches against South Africa and Zambia in January 2013, but withdrew from the squad due to sickness.

Career statistics

Club

Honours
Rosenborg
Eliteserien: 2015, 2016, 2017, 2018  
Norwegian Football Cup: 2015, 2016, 2018
Mesterfinalen: 2017

Norway U21
UEFA European Under-21 Championship bronze: 2013

References

External links 
 

1990 births
Living people
Sportspeople from Bodø
Norwegian footballers
Norway international footballers
Norway youth international footballers
Norway under-21 international footballers
Association football wingers
FK Bodø/Glimt players
Strømsgodset Toppfotball players
Stade Rennais F.C. players
Rosenborg BK players
Norwegian First Division players
Eliteserien players
Ligue 1 players
Norwegian expatriate footballers
Expatriate footballers in France
Norwegian expatriate sportspeople in France